Ignacio E. Grossmann (born 1949) is an American chemical engineer. He is the R. R. Dean University Professor in the Department of Chemical Engineering at Carnegie Mellon University. Grossmann received his B.S. degree from Universidad Iberoamericana in Mexico City in 1974. He did his M.S. and Ph.D. at Imperial College London with Roger W. H. Sargent in 1975 and 1977 respectively. In 2015 he was the first recipient of the Sargent Medal of the Institution of Chemical Engineers, named in honor of his doctoral advisor.
 
Grossmann is a member of US National Academy of Engineering, and Fellow of the American Institute of Chemical Engineers (AIChE), and a Fellow of Institute for Operations Research and the Management Sciences (INFORMS). He has a large academic family tree, and has an H-index of 122 by Google Scholar.

Grossmann is a co-author of the text book "Systematic Methods of Chemical Process Design". His main contributions are through peer-reviewed articles on mixed-integer nonlinear programming, heat integration, production scheduling, among others.

References 

American chemical engineers
Fellows of the American Institute of Chemical Engineers
1949 births
Living people